Howard Lang (born Donald Yarranton; 20 March 1911 – 11 December 1989) was an English actor known for playing Captain William Baines in the BBC nautical drama The Onedin Line.

Early life
Lang was born in Marylebone, London, the son of Edward John Yarranton (1884–1954) and Clara Ann (née Malkin) (1888–1921). His father had left the family's bookbinding business to become a senior commercial traveller for Winsor & Newton, the manufacturer of artists' materials.

Lang served for seven years in the Royal Navy including during World War II. In January 1941 he was appointed Temporary Sub-Lieutenant, and in January 1942 Temporary Lieutenant, a position he held until the end of the war.

His younger brother from his father's second marriage was Sir Peter Yarranton (1924–2003), chairman of the United Kingdom Sports Council from 1989 to 1994, and a notable figure in the world of rugby union, both as a player and as an administrator, for more than 40 years.

Acting career
For his role as seafaring Captain Baines in The Onedin Line (1971–1980) he gained international attention. In a 1977 interview in Radio Times Lang recalled a personal appearance in Norway:
When the series was first shown in Norway I was asked to make a personal appearance in a small shipbuilding town. As I was brought into Grimstad by sea I caught sight of huge crowds – all of 3,000 townsfolk out on the quay to greet me. I learned afterwards that I had been received as family because almost every home had an ancient photograph of an uncle, cousin or grandfather dressed and sideburned precisely as I appear on The Onedin Line.

Lang's other parts included roles in The Six Wives of Henry VIII (1970), Z-Cars, Softly, Softly, The Vise, and an appearance as caveman Horg in three of the four episodes of the first Doctor Who story, An Unearthly Child. He also played Winston Churchill in the 1983 TV miniseries The Winds of War.

He also played the role of Bert Hudd in the first production of Harold Pinter's first play,The Room.

In an early seafaring role, he had a cameo in Ben-Hur as the hortator aboard a Roman galley leading up to the epic battle with an enemy fleet.

Howard Lang died in West Hampstead, London in 1989 aged 78.

Filmography

Film

Television

References

External links 

1911 births
1989 deaths
English male film actors
English male television actors
People from Marylebone
Royal Navy personnel of World War II
Male actors from London
20th-century English male actors
Royal Navy officers